Richard Dindo (born 1944 in Zürich) is a Swiss documentary film director. He made his first film in 1970.

Filmography
Le Voyage de Bashô  (2018)
Homo Faber (drei Frauen)   (2014)
Vivaldi in Venedig  (2013 )
The Marsdreamers (2010)
La maternité des HUG (2007)
Gauguin à Tahiti et aux Marquises (2009)
Wer war Franz Kafka? (2005)
Trois jeunes femmes (entre la vie et la mort) (2004)
Aragon: le roman de Matisse (2003)
Ni olvido ni perdón (2003)
La maladie de la mémoire (2002)
Verhör und Tod in Winterthur (2002)
Genet à Chatila (1999)
HUG – L'hôpital cantonal universitaire de Genève (1998)
Grüningers Fall (1997)
Une saison au paradis (1996)
Ernesto «Che» Guevara: le Journal de Bolivie (1994)
Charlotte, vie ou théâtre? (1992)
Arthur Rimbaud, une biographie (1991)
Dani, Michi, Renato & Max (1987)
Max Haufler, «Der Stumme» (1983)
El suizo – un amour en Espagne (1986)
Max Frisch, Journal I-III (1981)
Hans Staub, Fotoreporter (1978)
Clément Moreau, der Gebrauchsgrafiker (1978)
Raimon - Lieder gegen die Angst  (1977)
Die Erschiessung des Landesverräters Ernst S. (1977)
Schweizer im spanischen Bürgerkrieg (1974)
Naive Maler in der Ostschweiz  (1972)

References

External links

1944 births
Living people
Film people from Zürich
Swiss documentary film directors
Swiss film directors